Pratap Mullick (1 July 1936 – 18 June 2007) was an Indian illustrator and comics artist. He was best known for illustrating Nagraj of Raj Comics which gained lot of popularity under him and was later handed to Anupam Sinha who made Nagraj an actual superhero. He worked for the Indian comic book series Amar Chitra Katha created by writer and editor Anant Pai. Mullick drew the first 50 issues of Nagraj from 1986 until 1995. He designed the comic-book character Supremo (based on movie star Amitabh Bachchan), who featured in a series published for two years in the 1980s.

As a veteran illustrator, Mullick ran his own comics studio and training workshop in Pune. He was also the author of an art-instruction book Sketching, which according to the publisher's website is "a condensation of Pratap Mulick’s life-long devotion to figure drawing and illustration". A blurb on the book claims that 50,000 copies have been sold till date.

Sanjay Gupta studio head and co-founder of Raj Comics shared his work experience with Pratap Mulick, during an interview with CulturePOPcorn.

Karline McLain, a researcher who worked at the Amar Chitra Katha production offices, wrote a book which discusses the work of Amar Chitra Katha artists and records conversations with Pratap Mullick.

Work

As Author and Illustrator
Sketching by Pratap Mullick (Jyotsna Prakashan)

Awards & Recognitions 
Late. Pratap Mullick was featured as Indian comics legend creative in the Legend Calendar 2019 released by Comix Theory in January 2019. He is featured on the front cover of the legend calendar.

Family
Pratap Mulick's son, Milind Mulick, is a well known watercolour artist based in Pune.

References

External links

 Legend of Pratap Mullick Godfather of Indian Comics Industry at CulturePOPcorn
 Pratap Mullick covers on YouTube
 'Pratap Mulick' at WorldCat
Legend Calendar 2019

Indian comics artists
Place of birth missing (living people)
Living people
1936 births